Elizabeth Alvina Platz is an American Lutheran pastor and was the first woman in North America ordained by a Lutheran church body. She was ordained in November 1970 into the Lutheran Church in America (LCA). The ordination of women, approved earlier that year by both the LCA and  The American Lutheran Church (ALC) was controversial. The ALC ordained its first woman as a pastor, Barbara Andrews, in December of the same year. The ALC and LCA merged in 1988 with the Association of Evangelical Lutheran Churches to form the Evangelical Lutheran Church in America (ELCA).

At the 2005 Churchwide Assembly of the ELCA in Orlando, Florida, a special program was held in honor of the 35 years since her history-making ordination. Platz served for 47 years as chaplain at the Lutheran Campus Ministry of the University of Maryland, College Park.

References

External links
ELCA page on ordination of Platz

Year of birth missing (living people)
Living people
21st-century American Lutheran clergy
20th-century American Lutheran clergy
University of Maryland, College Park faculty
Women Lutheran clergy